The Centre de services scolaire des Sommets is a French-language, school board operating in the province of Quebec, Canada. The school board, based in Magog, covers towns in the Eastern Townships of Quebec, specifically the towns of Magog, Asbestos, Windsor in an area around the city of Sherbrooke.

The school board covers a combined population of over 8550 primary and secondary students.

Elementary schools
École du Christ-Roi, Saint-Camille
École Hamelin, Wotton
École Masson, Danville
École Notre-Dame-de-l'Assomption, Saint-Georges-de-Windsor
École Notre-Dame-de-Lourdes, Saint-Adrien
École de la Passerelle, Asbestos
École de la Tourelle, Asbestos
École du Baluchon, Potton
École Brassard-Saint-Patrice, Magog
École des Deux-Soleils, Magog
École Dominique-Savio, Sainte-Catherine-de-Hatley
École du Jardin-des-Frontières, Stanstead
École Saint-Barthélemy, Ayer's Cliff
École Saint-Jean-Bosco, Magog
École Saint-Pie-X, Magog
École Sainte-Marguerite, Magog
École du Val-de-Grâce, Eastman
École de l'Arc-en-Ciel, Saint-François-Xavier-de-Brompton
École de la Chanterelle, Valcourt
École Notre-Dame-de-Bonsecours, Bonsecours
École Notre-Dame-de-Montjoie, Racine
École Notre-Dame-des-Érables, Sainte-Anne-de-la-Rochelle
École Notre-Dame-du-Sourire, Saint-Claude
École du Plein-Coeur, Richmond
École Saint-Gabriel, Windsor
École Saint-Laurent, Lawrenceville
École St-Philippe, Windsor

High schools
École secondaire de l'Escale, Asbestos
École secondaire de la Ruche, Magog
École secondaire de l'Odyssée, Valcourt
École secondaire du Tournesol, Windsor

External links
 School Board Website

References

Education in Estrie
Magog, Quebec
School districts in Quebec